Merritt is an unincorporated community in southwestern Douglas County, Missouri, United States. Merritt is located west of Goodhope on Missouri Route T in the Little Beaver Creek valley.

The Merritt store no longer exists, however, the Old Merritt store is still present approximately 1.25 miles west on Route T.

History
A post office called Merritt was established in 1903, and remained in operation until 1930. William Merrit, an early postmaster, gave the community his last name.

References

Unincorporated communities in Douglas County, Missouri
1903 establishments in Missouri
Unincorporated communities in Missouri